A Florida Enchantment (1914) is a silent film directed by Sidney Drew and released by the Vitagraph studio. The feature-length comedy/fantasy was shot in and around St. Augustine, Florida, where its story is set. It is notable for its cross-dressing lead characters, much later discussed as bisexual, lesbian, gay, and transgender. The film is based on the 1891 novel and 1896 play (now lost) of the same name written by Fergus Redmond and Archibald Clavering Gunter.

Plot
In the film, Lillian Travers, a wealthy Northern woman about to be married, visits her aunt in Florida. While there, she stops in a curiosity shop and buys a small casket which contains a note and a vial of seeds. At her aunt's house she reads the note which explains that the seeds change men into women and vice versa. Angry with her fiancé, Fred, Lillian decides to test the effects of the seeds. The next morning, Lillian discovers that she has transformed into a man. Lillian's transformation into Lawrence Talbot has also sometimes been read as a transformation into a butch lesbian. This reading is bolstered by the later transformation of Lillian's fiancé into what could be an effeminate gay man. However, as Lillian and her fiancé are shown attracted both to each other and to the same sex (albeit at different times), the film has also been considered to have the first documented appearance of bisexual characters in an American motion picture.

Cast
Edith Storey - Lillian Travers/Lawrence Talbot
Sidney Drew - Dr. Frederick Cassadene
Ethel Lloyd - Jane
Grace Stevens - Constancia Oglethorpe
Charles Kent - Major Horton
Jane Morrow (screen name for Lucille McVey, aka Mrs. Sidney Drew) - Bessie Horton
Ada Gifford - Stella Lovejoy
Lillian Burns - Malvina
Allan Campbell - Stockton Remington
Cortland van Deusen - Charley Wilkes
Frank O'Neil - Gustavus Duncan

Production background
The film includes white actors in blackface, an aspect carefully dissected in Siobhan B. Somerville's book Queering the Color Line Race and the Invention of Homosexuality in American Culture (Duke University Press, 2000). Since its inclusion in Vito Russo's 1981 book The Celluloid Closet: Homosexuality in the Movies and the documentary film adaptation, The Celluloid Closet (Rob Epstein and Jeffrey Friedman, 1995), A Florida Enchantment has been seen as one of the earliest screen representations of homosexuality and cross-dressing in American culture.

In Popular Culture
The film is a central element of the 2020 novel Antkind by Charlie Kaufman.

References

External links
 Video file of A Florida Enchantment is downloadable at the Internet Archive, https://archive.org/details/a-florida-enchantment-1914. The Vitagraph motion picture is in the public domain. 

1914 films
American silent feature films
American LGBT-related films
American black-and-white films
1914 comedy films
Vitagraph Studios films
Films based on American novels
American films based on plays
Films set in Florida
Films based on adaptations
Silent American comedy films
1910s LGBT-related films
Blackface minstrel shows and films
1910s American films